Jiří Levý (1926–1967) was a Czech literary theoretician, literary historian and translation theoretician. Levý's work was crucial for the development of translation theory in Czechoslovakia and it has subsequently influenced scholars internationally.

Early life and career
Jiří Levý was born on 8 August 1926 in Košice (East Slovakia), and died on 17 January 1967 in Brno (South Moravia). 
Levý studied English and Czech at Masaryk University in Brno (concluded in 1949).
From 1950 to 1963, he lectured at Palacký University of Olomouc.
From 1964 onwards, Levý worked at the Department of Czech Literature at Masaryk’s University in Brno.
His theses include:
The Development of Translation Theories and Methods in the Czech Literature (1957)
Fundamental Problems of the Theory of Translation (1958)
Problems of Comparative Versification (1963)

Levý also lectured on the theory of translation abroad (e.g. in Dubrovnik, Warsaw, Hamburg, Vienna, Stuttgart).

Publications
Levý organized two conferences on the theory of verse. He founded the Group for Exact Methods and Interdisciplinary Relations. He was a member of the Union of Czechoslovak Writers, worked for the Translation Department of the Union of Czech Writers, and he was a member of the International Federation of Translators.

Levý’s first published monograph, Czech Theories of Translation, includes his (PhD.) thesis The Development of Translation Theories and Methods in the Czech Literature as well as a series of significant theorizing essays by Czech translators. Thus, the monograph is concerned with translation norms from the 15th century until 1945.

Levý’s second monograph, The Art of Translation, is a fundamental opus on the translation of “artistic literature” (belles lettres). It deals with the genesis and composition of a literary translation. It puts emphasis on the translation of poetry. It was translated into German in 1969, Russian in 1974, and Serbo-Croatian in 1982 (see above).

Levý was also concerned with the theory of verse. In many of his essays, he deals with the problems of verse translation ("Isochronism of Facts and Isosyllabism as Factors of the Poetic Rhythm"; "Verse Rhythm as a Means of Dramatic Interpretation"; "The Verse of the Czech Folk Poetry and its Echoes"; "The Development of the Czech Theatre Blank-Verse," etc.).

Levý also wrote significant essays on T. S. Eliot, Walt Whitman, Ben Jonson and others.

The collection of his essays Will the Study of Literature Become an Exact Science? appeared posthumously in 1971.

According to Levý, translation is a process of communication: the objective of translation is to give the knowledge of the original to the foreign reader. From the point of view of the working situation of the translator at any moment of his work, translating is a decision process. For example, the translator is given the following title to translate: Der gute Mensch. S/he can translate it in two variants: "The Good Man" or "The Good Woman."

Key monographs 

LEVÝ, Jiří. 1957 (1996). České teorie překladu [=Czech Theories of Translation]. Prague.

LEVÝ, Jiří. 1963 (1983, 1998, 2012). Umění překladu [=The Art of Translation]. Prague.

LEVÝ, Jiří. 1971. Bude literární věda exaktní vědou? [Will the Study of Literature Become an Exact Science?]. Prague: Československý spisovatel.

Monagraphs in English translation

Key articles in English and German 

LEVÝ, Jiří. 1964. Translation in Czechoslovakia. In: Babel 10, No. 2, pp. 73–76.

LEVÝ, Jiří. 1965. Die Theorie des Verses – ihre matematische Aspekte. In: Matematik und Dichtung. Munich, pp. 211–231.

LEVÝ, Jiří. 1966. Translation as a Decision Process. In: To Honor Roman Jakobson: Essays on the Occasion of his Seventieth Birthday. 11 October 1966. The Hague.

LEVÝ, Jiří. 1967. Translation in Czechoslovakia. In: Ten Years of Translation – Proceedings of the Fourth Congress of the International Federation of Translators. Dubrovnik 1963. Oxford 1967. Pp. 211–218.

LEVÝ, Jiří. 1969. Mathematical Aspects of the Theory of Verse. In: Statistics and Style. Ed. L. Doležel. New York, American Elsevier Publishing Company. Pp. 95–112.

LEVÝ, Jiří. 1970. Generative Poetics. In: Sign, Language, Culture. The Hague, Mouton. Pp. 548–557.

LEVÝ, Jiří. 1971. Generative Poetik. In: Literaturwissenschaft und Linguistik. Ergebnisse und Perspektiven II/2. Frankfurt am Main, Athenäum. Pp. 554–567.

References

1926 births
1967 deaths
Academic staff of Masaryk University
Translation scholars
Masaryk University alumni
Academic staff of Palacký University Olomouc